In mathematics, Young's inequality for products is a mathematical inequality about the product of two numbers. The inequality is named after William Henry Young and should not be confused with Young's convolution inequality.

Young's inequality for products can be used to prove Hölder's inequality. It is also widely used to estimate the norm of nonlinear terms in PDE theory, since it allows one to estimate a product of two terms by a sum of the same terms raised to a power and scaled.

Standard version for conjugate Hölder exponents

The standard form of the inequality is the following:

It can be used to prove Hölder's inequality.

This form of Young's inequality can also be proved via Jensen's inequality.

Young's inequality may equivalently be written as

Where this is just the concavity of the logarithm function. 
Equality holds if and only if  or

Generalizations

Elementary case

An elementary case of Young's inequality is the inequality with exponent 

  This name refers to the fact that tighter control of the second term is achieved at the cost of losing some control of the first term – one must "rob Peter to pay Paul"

Proof: Young's inequality with exponent  is the special case  However, it has a more elementary proof.

Start by observing that the square of every real number is zero or positive.  Therefore, for every pair of real numbers  and  we can write:
 
Work out the square of the right hand side:
 
Add  to both sides:

Divide both sides by 2 and we have Young's inequality with exponent 

Matricial generalization

T. Ando proved a generalization of Young's inequality for complex matrices ordered 
by Loewner ordering. It states that for any pair  of complex matrices of order  there exists a unitary matrix  such that

where  denotes the conjugate transpose of the matrix and

Standard version for increasing functions

For the standard version of the inequality,

with equality if and only if 

With  and  this reduces to standard version for conjugate Hölder exponents.

For details and generalizations we refer to the paper of Mitroi & Niculescu.

Generalization using Fenchel–Legendre transforms

By denoting the convex conjugate of a real function  by  we obtain

This follows immediately from the definition of the convex conjugate. For a convex function  this also follows from the Legendre transformation.

where  is the dual pairing.

Examples

See also

Notes

References

External links

 Young's Inequality at PlanetMath
 

Articles containing proofs
Inequalities